The St. Mary's Rattlers are the athletic teams that represent St. Mary's University, Texas, located in San Antonio, Texas, United States in NCAA Division II intercollegiate sporting competitions. The Rattlers compete as members of the Lone Star Conference for all 11 varsity sports. St. Mary's was a member of the Heartland Conference from 1999 to 2019.

Sports sponsored

History
Before St. Mary's was recognized as a senior college in 1925, there was no formal conference competition, so the rivalry between the downtown and Woodlawn campuses was fierce. St. Mary's was an all-male school for more than a century. Women's intercollegiate athletics, begun in 1968, have enjoyed many triumphs.

Conference affiliations

Baseball
Interscholastic athletics competition began with baseball in 1902. The colorful history of St. Mary's athletics includes a stellar 1910 baseball team, which lost only to Ty Cobb's Detroit Tigers in an exhibition game, Records show the 1902 baseball team went 6–0, and the 1910 squad also went undefeated except for the aforementioned game against the Tigers. With the onset of the Depression, intercollegiate baseball disappeared only to be resurrected in 1947 by then-athletics director Brother Bill Siemer, S.M. Over the years, St. Mary's baseball has won local, regional and national fame. Accomplishments include 24 conference championships, four NAIA College World Series appearances and, most recently, the 2001 NCAA Division II conference, regional and national championships.

Coaches
 Bill Siemer 1947-1953 
 Eugene Gittinger 1954 
 Jim Heiser 1955-1956 
 Elmer Kosub 1957-1960, 1964-1986 
 Mel Barborak 1961-1963 
 Charlie Migl 1987-2021 
 Chris Ermis 2022-present

Basketball

Men's basketball 

St. Mary's men's basketball program also has enjoyed success over many years. In 1926, the school's first intercollegiate basketball team posted a 12–7 record. NAIA held district tournaments between 1951-1992. Conference championship tournaments supplanted them in 1993.

Heartland Conference Regular Season Champions 
2001, 2003, 2005, 2008, 2012, 2013, 2015

Record

  James Clifford went 1–2 and Edward Barret went 6-2 as head coaches, respectively.
  Br. Bill Siemer went 3-5 and Br. Gene Gittinger went 9-10 as head coaches, respectively.

Women's basketball 
The school hosted the NCAA Women's Division II Basketball Championship at the Bill Greehey Arena in 2009, 2012 and 2013.

Record

Golf
St. Mary's first individual national championship came in 2006, when Jamie Amoretti won the NCAA Division II Men's Golf title.  The Men's Golf team would be named the Golf Coaches Association of America 2008–2009 Academic National Champions, a title which St. Mary's treats as a fifth team national championship.

Football

and a stint by future U.S. president Dwight Eisenhower as coach of the 1916 football team. In 1939, both Collier's and Life magazines feature full-page spreads on the St. Mary's football team and their cross country trips in a ragged bus, the "Blue Goose". The team was disbanded due to World War II. Following the end of intercollegiate football at the start of World War II, there have been at least three attempts to revive full-contact sports on campus: a club football team in the early 1970s, a club rugby team in the early 1990s, and a Texas Rugby Union Collegiate Division III team formed in Fall 2010.

Record

Softball
The softball team has led the way, winning several conference titles, playing in the NAIA and NCAA Division II national tournaments, and winning the 1986 NAIA National Championship and the 2002 Division II National Championship.

Athletics honors
Basketball head coach and athletics director Herman A “Buddy” Meyer has also been inducted into the Heartland Conference Hall of Fame.

National championships
St. Mary's has won four team national championships in men's basketball (1989), baseball (2001), softball (1986 and 2002), and one individual national title in men's golf (2006).

Team (4)

Individual (1)

Facilities

Mascot
The Rattler mascot has its own stories of how it came to be. Legend holds that the football practice field had to be cleared of diamondback rattlesnakes on a regular basis, thus leading to the designation. The truth is that Brother Kinsky thought “Rattlers” would be fitting because there was already on campus Rattler Club whose members had recently begun The Rattler newspaper. There was debate as to whether the name was being run into the ground, but the students quickly said they wanted the Rattler nickname.

Alton Seekatz (B.S.C. ’32), a member of the Rattler Club, described the organization as a spirit and social organization. “It was called the Rattler Club when I got here in 1926, and I’m not sure how it got its nickname,” he said, although his stories of the club members' antics and efforts to raise school spirit would certainly “rattle” some and “shake” up others.

References

External links